The  is a rapid transit electric multiple unit operated by the Transportation Bureau City of Nagoya on the Nagoya Subway Meijō Line and Meikō Line in Japan since 1989.

Specifications
This model controls the amount of current applied to the motors with a variable frequency drive inverter.

Formation
The trainsets are formed as follows.

References

External links
 
 Nippon Sharyo's page on the 2000 series 
 Nagoya Transportation Bureau's page on the 2000 series 

Electric multiple units of Japan
2000 series
Train-related introductions in 1989
600 V DC multiple units
Nippon Sharyo multiple units